Yo! I Killed Your God is a concept album by Marc Ribot, recorded live between 1992 and 1994. It was released May 18, 1999 on Tzadik Records.

Reception
The Allmusic review by David Freedlander awarded the album 4 stars, stating, "All in all, another fine effort from a virtuoso guitarist. Difficult listening, but worth the effort".

Track listing
All compositions by Marc Ribot, except where noted.
"I Fall to Pieces" – 0:47
"Yo! I Killed Your God" – 2:58
"Human Sacrifice" – 10:03
"The Wind Cries Mary" (Jimi Hendrix) – 6:36
"Softly as in a Morning Sunrise" (Oscar Hammerstein II, Sigmund Romberg) – 5:34
"Fourth World" – 8:18
"Requiem for What’s His Name" – 5:09
"Somebody In My House" – 3:10
"Clever White Youths with Attitude" – 2:31
"Expressionless" – 1:49
"Jamon Con Yucca" – 4:12
"Pulse" – 8:08
"Change Has Come" – 9:07
"Mon Petit Punk" – 4:16

Personnel
Tracks 1–7 were recorded live at CBGB, New York City (November 1992).
Marc Ribot – guitar, vocals
Chris Wood – guitar
Sebastian Steinberg – bass
Dougie Bowne – drums
Tracks 8–9 were recorded live at CBGB, New York (December 1992).
Marc Ribot – guitar, vocals
Roger Kleier – guitar
Sebastian Steinberg – bass
Jim Pugliese – drums
Track 10 was recorded live at Rote Fabrik, Zurich (1994).
Marc Ribot – guitar, vocals
JD Foster – guitar
Chris Wood – bass
Jim Pugliese – drums
Christine Bard – drums
Track 11 was recorded live in Tokyo (1994).
Marc Ribot – guitar, vocals
JD Foster – guitar
Sebastian Steinberg – bass
Jim Pugliese – drums
Christine Bard – drums
Tracks 12–13 were recorded live in Nagoya (1994).
Marc Ribot – guitar, vocals
JD Foster – guitar
Sebastian Steinberg – bass
Jim Pugliese – drums
Christine Bard – drums
Track 14 was recorded at Low Blood Studio, New York (1994).
Marc Ribot – guitar, vocals
Mark Anthony Thompson – bass, sequencer
Francois Lardeau – drum programming

Personnel
John Zorn – producer
Marc Ribot – producer
Kazunori Sugiyama – associate producer
Mark Anthony Thompson – producer (track 14)
Allan Tucker – mastering engineer
Shoichi – photographer
Danny C – photographer
Bert Detant – photographer
Ikue Mori – design

References

Marc Ribot live albums
1999 live albums
Tzadik Records live albums
Albums produced by John Zorn
Albums recorded at CBGB